Urzicuța is a commune in Dolj County, Oltenia, Romania with a population of 3,154 people. It is composed of two villages, Urzica Mare and Urzicuța.

It neighbors Giurgița commune to the north and east, Bârca commune to the east, Bistreț commune to the south, Afumați commune to the south and west, and Siliștea Crucii commune to the west.
Urzicuța is traversed by county road DJ561A

Natives
 Victorina Bora (b. 1972), handball player
 Nicolae Zamfir (b. 1967), footballer

References

Communes in Dolj County
Localities in Oltenia